David Edward Lloyd (born December 1963) is a British Conservative Party politician and financial adviser. Since 2012, he has been the Hertfordshire Police and Crime Commissioner for Hertfordshire Constabulary. He was a member of Milton Keynes Council in the 1990s and was a member of Hertfordshire County Council from 2001 to 2017.

Early life
Lloyd was born in Bristol, England, and educated in Berkshire. He studied French at the University of Birmingham and at the University of Lyon.

Career

Business career
Following university, Lloyd spent ten years working in banking. Since then, he has worked as a financial adviser.

Political career
Lloyd was a local councillor. From 1992 to 1996, he was a member of Milton Keynes Council. On 7 June 2001, he was elected as a member of Hertfordshire County Council. Before being elected as PCC, he served as deputy leader of the county council. He also served as Chairman of the Hertfordshire Police Authority.

On 15 November 2012, Lloyd was elected the Hertfordshire Police and Crime Commissioner (PCC) for Hertfordshire Constabulary. He is the first person to hold this appointment; the PCCs were created to replace the now-abolished police authorities.  He was-re-elected to the role in May 2021.

References

Police and crime commissioners in England
Living people
1963 births
Politicians from Berkshire
Financial advisors
Conservative Party (UK) councillors
Conservative Party police and crime commissioners
Members of Hertfordshire County Council
Councillors in Buckinghamshire